Wallenia clusioides is a species of plant in the family Primulaceae. It is endemic to Jamaica.

References

clusioides
Endemic flora of Jamaica
Taxonomy articles created by Polbot